Cryptologa is a genus of moths in the family Gracillariidae. It was described by Thomas Bainbrigge Fletcher in 1921.

Species
Cryptologa nystalea T. B. Fletcher, 1921

External links
Global Taxonomic Database of Gracillariidae (Lepidoptera)

Gracillariinae
Gracillarioidea genera